The Open BLS de Limoges (formerly Open GDF Suez de Limoges, Open GDF Suez Région Limousin and Engie Open de Limoges) is a tournament for professional female tennis players played on indoor hardcourts. The event is currently classified as a WTA 125 tournament and has been held in Limoges, France since 2007. Until 2013, the tournament was held annually as one of the ITF Women's Circuit.

Past finals

Singles

Doubles

External links
 WTA Open BLS De Limoges 

 
WTA 125 tournaments
ITF Women's World Tennis Tour
Tennis tournaments in France
Hard court tennis tournaments
Indoor tennis tournaments
Recurring sporting events established in 2007